RC Spartak Trnava is a Slovakian rugby club based in Trnava. They currently only compete in sevens.

External links
 RC Spartak Trnava

Slovak rugby union teams
Sport in Trnava